Chautemps is a surname. Notable people with the surname include: 

Camille Chautemps (1885–1963), French politician
Émile Chautemps (1850–1918), French politician
Jean-Louis Chautemps (1931–2022), French jazz saxophonist
Julien Simon-Chautemps (born 1978), French motor racing engineer